Eubrachycercus is a monotypic genus of East African brushed trapdoor spiders containing the single species, Eubrachycercus smithi. It was first described by Reginald Innes Pocock in 1897, and has only been found in Somalia.

References

Endemic fauna of Somalia
Barychelidae
Monotypic Mygalomorphae genera
Spiders of Africa
Taxa named by R. I. Pocock